Immanuel College is a Lutheran school in Novar Gardens, Adelaide, South Australia – a co-educational day and boarding school from Year 7 to 12, offering the International Baccalaureate Middle Years Programme. Established in 1895, the College is a school of the Lutheran Church of Australia. It is the only Lutheran college in Adelaide that has boarders. Its sister schools include Johann-Sebastian-Bach-Gymnasium in Windsbach, Germany and Kyushu Lutheran College in Kumamoto, Japan.

History 

Immanuel College was founded by Pastor Georg Leidig in 1895 at Point Pass (north of Eudunda, east of the Clare Valley), before its subsequent move to North Adelaide in 1921. 

During WWII, the buildings were required by the air force, and the college was forced to temporarily move to North Walkerville for the period 1942–1946. Pastor Leidig's eldest son Paul taught there from 1950 until 1956. In 1949, land at Novar Gardens was acquired from the Morphett family property 'Cummins', and the school was eventually established there in 1957. 

Cummins House was sold to the  state government in 1977, and Immanuel College leased that property for five years from 1982 to 1987.

Sport
Immanuel College is a member of the Sports Association for Adelaide Schools (SAAS), and the Independent Girls Schools Sports Association (IGSSA).

Sports centre
To celebrate the 50th anniversary of its Novar Gardens campus, Immanuel College upgraded the school gymnasium.  The sports centre includes a heated 25-metre 10-lane indoor swimming pool, a heated 15-metre by 6-metre hydrotherapy and learners pool, 3 indoor courts and a dance studio. A primary school oval was converted into the indoor basketball courts, and an existing auditorium and a new dance classroom were integrated into the new centre. Completed in 2008, the centre operates as an educational facility during the day, and as a community sports centre after hours.

IGSSA premierships 
Immanuel College has won the following IGSSA premierships.

 Athletics (4) - 2009, 2010, 2015, 2021
 Badminton (3) - 1995, 2016, 2017
 Basketball (16) - 1995, 1998, 1999, 2004, 2005, 2006, 2008, 2010, 2014, 2015, 2016, 2017, 2018, 2019, 2020, 2021
 Football (2) - 2017, 2018
 Netball (13) - 1998, 1999, 2006, 2007, 2010, 2012, 2013, 2014, 2015, 2016, 2017, 2018, 2021
 Soccer (5) - 2009, 2010, 2011, 2012, 2013
 Swimming (4) - 2011, 2012, 2014, 2015
 Tennis (2) - 2020, 2021
 Volleyball (3) - 1998, 2000, 2004

The Margaret Ames Centre 

The Margaret Ames Centre, named after an old scholar and ex-teacher, was opened in 2015 as the senior school for students in Years 10, 11 and 12. It includes classrooms, study areas, a cafe called "Wings Cafe" (based on the Immanuel logo of a dove), and a university style theatre called "The Otto Theatre". It has library access and has 4 floors. It is a modern looking building unattached from the old style of the middle school. The Margaret Ames Centre cost $14.9m AUD at the time of construction.

Boarding 
Immanuel has a long history of boarding, commencing with its inception as an exclusively boarding school at Point Pass in 1895. In the 21st century, Immanuel has boarding facilities for both males and females. In 2019 the College has beds for 170 students, accommodation is in a main double storey building, self-contained units and eight fully equipped houses. The houses are named after the word for "Peace" in various languages – Heiwa, Pengon, Tangokorro, Frieden, Shalom, Koinonia, Sama and Rahu.

Notable alumni

Arts and media 
 Alex Carapetis – musician, professional drummer
 Niki Vasilakis – violinist
 Warren H Williams (born 1963) – musician

Business 
  Martin Albrecht – former CEO Thiess Pty Ltd.
 Peter Lehman – winemaker

Politicians 
 Karl Hampton – former Member of NT Legislative Council. CEO Central Australia Aboriginal Media Association
 Condor Laucke – former President of the Australian Senate. former Lieutenant Governor or South Australia
 Steven Marshall – 46th Premier of South Australia
 Bronwyn Pike – former Victorian Minister. Chair of the Board Uniting Care Australia.
 Berthold Teusner – former SA House of Assembly Member; former Speaker of the SA House of Assembly. 
 Matt Williams

Sports 

Cameron Borgas and Jason Borgas - Cricketers
Kyle Chalmers, swimmer – Olympic Gold medalist
Emma Checker – soccer player
Curtly Hampton, footballer
Lleyton Hewitt, tennis player
Sarah Klau – netballer
Cody Lange-netballer
Don Lindner – footballer
Jordan McMahon – footballer 
Kieran Modra – Paralympian Cyclist, Swimmer and Athlete – multiple medal winner
Tania Modra, Paralympic tandem cycling pilot and gold medallist – Kieran's sister
Brad Ottens, footballer
Maisie Nankivell-netballer/footballer
Lauren Nourse – netballer 
Hannah Petty-netballer
Anna Rawson - golfer
Shaun Rehn, footballer
Matthew Scharenberg, footballer
Billy Stretch, footballer
Luke Partington, footballer, 2019 Magarey Medalist 
Laura and Natalie von Bertouch, netballers 
Samuel Von Einem – Paralympian table tennis player 
Jenny Williams (sportsperson) – Australian sportsperson, lacrosse and football
Mark and Stephen Williams, footballers

See also
List of schools in South Australia
List of boarding schools in Australia
List of Lutheran schools in Australia

References

External links
 

Lutheran schools in Australia
Private secondary schools in Adelaide
Boarding schools in South Australia
Educational institutions established in 1895
International Baccalaureate schools in Australia
1895 establishments in Australia
High schools and secondary schools affiliated with the Lutheran Church